Kim Hyong Jik University of Education is a university in North Korea located in Tongdaewon-guyok, Pyongyang.

History
The school started as the Pyongyang Teacher Training College(평양교원대학) on October 1, 1946, as a 2-year tertiary educational institution. In 1948 it was promoted to a 4-year degree as the Pyongyang University of Education. In 1972, the school was divided to Pyongyang University of Education No.1 and No.2, and No.1 became the current Kim Hyong Jik University of Education in 1975 after Kim Hyong-jik, father of Kim Il Sung. In 1980 it became a 5-year course.

Notable achievements
The university is trying to improve on the quality of biology education and has opened 20 related departments.

References

Universities in North Korea
Educational institutions established in 1946
Education in Pyongyang
1946 establishments in North Korea